In biology, the BBCH-scale for peanut describes the phenological development of peanuts using the BBCH-scale.

The phenological growth stages and BBCH-identification keys of peanuts are:

1 Leaves are counted from the cotyledon node (= node 0)
2 Side shoot development may occur earlier; in this case continue with principal growth stage 2
4 Only for varieties with a determinate flowering period
5 Criteria of maturity: Pericarp hard, with distinct texture, can be split open easily;

References
 
BBCH-scale
Peanuts